Orchis anthropophora (formerly Aceras anthropophorum), the man orchid, is a European species of orchid whose flowers resemble a human figure. The head is formed by the petals and sepals, and the suspended torso and limbs by the lobes of the labellum. It usually grows in calcareous grassland.

Description 
A basal rosette of  lanceolate leaves develops from a tuber  in diameter, and between April and June a central flower spike is produced bearing up to fifty small, stemless flowers – the flowers vary from greenish, with a yellow-green labellum, to green, streaked and marked with purple.

Habitat
Orchis anthropophora favours moderately sunny meadows on well-drained, often calcareous soil. It is to be found around the Mediterranean area, and in central and western Europe as far north as southern England. It also grows in alpine areas, but not at high altitude.

It is native to Great Britain, central Europe (Austria, Belgium, Germany, the Netherlands, and Switzerland), southwestern Europe (the Balearic Islands, Corsica, France, Portugal, Sardinia, and Spain), southeastern Europe (Albania, Greece, Italy, Crete, Sicily, and countries of the former Yugoslavia), northern Africa (Algeria, Morocco, and Tunisia), and western Asia (Cyprus, East Aegean Islands, Lebanon, Syria, and Turkey).

See also
 Naked man orchid

References

External links
 
 

anthropophora
Orchids of Europe
Flora of North Africa
Flora of Western Asia